The 2019 Women's Volleyball Kor Royal Cup is the latest edition of the Women's Volleyball Kor Royal Cup, the tournament patronized by Princess Maha Chakri Sirindhorn, The Princess Royal of Thailand for women's senior volleyball clubs, also known as 2019 Sealect Tuna Women's Senior Volleyball Kor Royal Cup Thailand Championship due to the sponsorship deal with Sealect Tuna. A total of 6 teams will compete in the tournament.

Teams

Pools composition

References 

2018 in women's volleyball
Volleyball competitions in Thailand